Rupit i Pruit is a municipality in the comarca of Osona in Catalonia, Spain situated in the Sierra de la Cabrera mountain range near Barcelona. It is made up of two formerly separate settlements, Rupit and Pruit, whuch were independent until 1977. The medieval village of Rupit emerged around the 12th century thanks to important local families. The most notible feature is its old town, which is connected by a  suspension bridge. The largest waterfall in Catalonia at Sallent are nearby

Villages
Pruit
Rupit

References

 Panareda Clopés, Josep Maria; Rios Calvet, Jaume; Rabella Vives, Josep Maria (1989). Guia de Catalunya, Barcelona: Caixa de Catalunya.  (Spanish).  (Catalan).

External links
 Government data pages 

Municipalities in Osona